Queen Of The Yukon is a 1940 American Western film. The film is an adaptation of Jack London's story. Filming took place in Big Bear Lake, California.

Plot
Sadie Martin owns a riverboat that is frequently used by miners traveling to their claims. During their trip, the miners drink and gamble. Sadie's daughter, Helen, is unaware of her mother's work because her mother sends her to boarding school in order to live a lifestyle more attributed to the upper-class. Unfortunately for Sadie, she is facing difficulty maintaining the costly riverboat. She is soon forced to sell the boat in order to make ends meet. However, greater problems soon enter Sadie's life as the Yukon Mining Company sends John Thorne to take the riverboat away from her, as well as to cheat all of her customers out of their claims. Meanwhile, Helen unexpectedly arrives on the riverboat with her boyfriend Bob. Bob takes a job with John and is unknowingly manipulated by him. To Sadie's disappointment, Helen appears to enjoy life on the riverboat. Sadie soon implores Ace Rincon to help her.

Cast
Charles Bickford.....Ace Rincon
Irene Rich.....Sadie Martin
June Carlson.....Helen Martin
Dave O'Brien.....Bob Adams
George Cleveland.....Grub
Guy Usher.....Stake
Melvin Lang.....John Thorne
Tris Coffin.....Carson
Jack Daley.....Captain

External links
 
 
 

1940 films
American black-and-white films
Films based on works by Jack London
Films directed by Phil Rosen
1940 Western (genre) films
Films shot in California
Monogram Pictures films
Films based on short fiction
American Western (genre) films
Northern (genre) films
1940s English-language films
1940s American films